John Kennedy was an Irish Gaelic footballer. His championship career at senior level with the Dublin county team lasted four seasons from 1891 until 1894.

Kennedy first played competitive football with the Young Irelands club. He won four successive county senior championship medals with the club between 1891 and 1894.

Young Irelands represented Dublin in the championship, with Kennedy making his inter-county debut during the 1891 championship. As captain of the team over the following four seasons, he won three All-Ireland medals during that time - the first player to captain a team to three championships. Kennedy also won three Leinster medals.

Honours

Young Irelands
Dublin Senior Football Championship (4): 1891, 1892, 1893, 1894

Dublin
All-Ireland Senior Football Championship (3): 1891 (c), 1892 (c), 1894 (c)
Leinster Senior Football Championship (3): 1891 (c), 1892 (c), 1894 (c)

References

Dublin inter-county Gaelic footballers